"Still Fly" is a single by American hip hop group Big Tymers, released as the lead single from their 2002 album Hood Rich. It reached number 3 on the Hot Rap Tracks chart, number 4 on the Hot R&B/Hip-Hop Songs chart, and number 11 on the Billboard Hot 100 chart, making it their highest-charting and most successful song ever, and was also ranked #50 on the Billboard Year-End Hot 100 singles of 2002 chart. The song's chorus interpolates "The Ballad of Gilligan's Isle", the theme song from the sitcom Gilligan's Island.

The song was covered by metalcore band The Devil Wears Prada in 2008 for the compilation album Punk Goes Crunk, and was also sampled by Canadian rapper Drake, who later would sign to Cash Money Records under Lil Wayne's Young Money imprint. Additionally, the song was heavily sampled in the single "Fast Lane" by Don Toliver, Lil Durk, and Latto, which appears on the soundtrack to the 2021 film F9 and in the film's ending credits.

Charts

Weekly charts

Year-end charts

Release history

References

2002 singles
Big Tymers songs
Cash Money Records singles
Song recordings produced by Mannie Fresh
The Devil Wears Prada (band) songs
2002 songs
Songs written by Mannie Fresh
Songs written by Birdman (rapper)